Moringa drouhardii, the bottle tree, is an endemic species of southwest Madagascar. It occurs in the Madagascar spiny thickets ecoregion, especially at the limestone cliffs to the east of Lake Tsimanampetsotsa, on the Mahafaly Plateau.
The species is often planted in local villages and around traditional tombs.  Neither the seeds (rich in edible oil and flocculating proteins) nor the leaves (that can be eaten as green vegetables) are traditionally used in the Atsimo-Andrefana Region (southwestern Madagascar) despite their significant benefits.

References

Gallery

Drouhardii
Endemic flora of Madagascar
Trees of Madagascar